Où ça nous mène is the debut studio album by French singer-songwriter Isleym. It was released on iTunes on 21 April 2014 by Play On and 7th Magnitude. The album entered the French Albums Chart at number 45 in its first week, and peaked at the same position.

Background
At the age of 14, Isleym was discovered by French rapper Nessbeal and record producer Skread, and later signed to Skread's record label 7th Magnitude. She began writing and composing songs with Dany Synthé, and after the release of her debut single "Avec le temps", she decided that she had to begin working on an album.

Singles
Où ça nous mène has produced 3 singles so far:
 "Avec le temps" was released as the lead single of Isleym's debut extended play of the same name on 1 April 2011. It peaked at number 79 on the French Singles Chart, and number 47 on the Belgian Ultratip 50 chart in Wallonia.
 "Petit bateau" was released as the second single of the album on 21 October 2013, but has never charted.
 "Oublie-moi" was released as the album's third single on 23 April 2014, but has never charted.

Track listing

Producer credits:

Chart performance

References

2014 debut albums
Isleym albums
7th Magnitude albums
Albums produced by Skread